Adidas Nemeziz are a range of football boots created by German sportswear manufacturers Adidas. It was launched in 2017 as the 'agility' boots, replacing the signature Messi silo in the process. As in other Adidas top-range football boots, the Nemeziz are produced in two top-range variations - the laceless '+' and laced '.1' variations.

Adidas themselves also produce special variation for Argentine Footballer Lionel Messi. Unlike his previous line of football boots (F50 Messi and Messi 15 and 16), Nemeziz Messi shares same configuration with regular Nemeziz boots, although the laceless variation are no longer made in Messi's colorway.

In 2018, Adidas launched the X18, in orange color.

See also
 Adidas Predator

References

External links
  (archived)

Adidas
N